The Brazil national badminton team represents Brazil in international badminton team competitions. It is controlled by the Brazil Badminton Confederation (Portuguese: Confederação Brasileira de Badminton). Brazil is one of South America's most active badminton nations, with its mixed team participating four times in the Sudirman Cup.

The mixed team were runners-up twice at the Pan American Badminton Championships mixed team event. The men's and women's team were runners-up and semifinalists at the 2022 Pan Am Male & Female Badminton Cup.

Brazil also competes in para-badminton. Para-badminton players, Cintya Oliveira and Vitor Gonçalves Tavares have contributed into earning Brazil a medal at the BWF Para-Badminton World Championships.

Participation in BWF competitions
Sudirman Cup

Participation in Pan American Badminton Championships

Men's team

Mixed team

Participation in Pan American Games 
Brazil has won a gold, two silvers and seven bronze medals at the Pan American Games in badminton. In 2019, Ygor Coelho won Brazil's first gold medal in badminton at the 2019 Pan American Games in Lima, Peru.

List of medalists

Notable players 

Men     
Daniel Paiola
Alex Tjong
Ygor Coelho
Hugo Arthuso

Women
Lohaynny Vicente
Fabiana Silva
Luana Vicente
Paula Beatriz Pereira

Current squad 
A new generation of badminton players have been selected to represent Brazil in the 2022 Pan Am Male & Female Badminton Cup.

Men     
Izak Batalha
Ygor Coelho
Fabricio Farias
Francielton Farias
Jonathan Matias
Donnians Oliveira
Artur Silva Pomoceno
Davi Silva
Deivid Silva
Matheus Voigt

Women
Jeisiane Alves
Jaqueline Lima
Sâmia Lima
Sania Lima
Tamires Santos
Juliana Viena Vierra

Coach Marco Vasconcelos

References

Badminton
National badminton teams
Badminton in Brazil